Karin Oberhofer (born 3 November 1985) is an Italian biathlete. She competes in the Biathlon World Cup. Oberhofer has won a bronze medal at the Biathlon World Championships 2013 (4x6 km relay). She also competed at the 2010 Winter Olympics (11th place in the relay). Together with Dorothea Wierer, Dominik Windisch and Lukas Hofer she won a bronze medal in the Mixed relay at the 2014 Winter Olympics, in Sochi, Russia.

Record

Olympic Games

World Championships

World Cup

Podiums

References

External links
 
 IBU profile

1985 births
Living people
Italian female biathletes
Biathlon World Championships medalists
Olympic biathletes of Italy
Biathletes at the 2010 Winter Olympics
Biathletes at the 2014 Winter Olympics
Sportspeople from Brixen
Germanophone Italian people
Medalists at the 2014 Winter Olympics
Olympic bronze medalists for Italy
Olympic medalists in biathlon